Air Marshal Shah Mohammad Ziaur Rahman, ndc, fawc, psc (born 1955) was Chief of Staff of the Bangladesh Air Force. He was preceded by Air Vice Marshal Fakhrul Azam, ndc, psc.

Early life

S M Ziaur Rahman, was born in 1955 in to a Muslim family in Gopalgonj. He joined the Bangladesh Air Force (BAF) as a flight cadet on March 10, 1975 and was commissioned on December 29, 1976 in the General Duties (Pilot) [GD(P)] branch .

Zia graduated from the Defence Services Command & Staff College in Dhaka in 1991 and from the PAF Air War College in 1992. He also graduated from National Defence College, Pakistan in 2001. Afterwards he participated in the seminars for “Executive Course” at USA Asia Pacific Centre for Security Studies and the “Military and Peace Keeping Operations in Accordance with Rule of Law" course in Rhode Island, USA in 2003 and 2006 respectively.

Recognition

Ziaur Rahman was a qualified fighter pilot and a Qualified Flying Instructor of the BAF who had logged over 2400. He served in various air squadrons across BAF stations. Some of the noted aircraft he flew was MiG-21 and F-7. Being a “Qualified Flying Instructor”, he carried out extensive instructional flying in various jet trainer and fighter aircraft such as L39Z F7 Fouga both at home and abroad.

Air  Commands

Zia had held command positions with most of the air squadrons of the Bangladesh Air Force. He successfully commanded the BAF's two fighter squadrons, 25 & 35 squadron.

Ziaur Rahman also held a range of staff command positions including Air Officer Commanding, Paharkanchanpur, Air Officer Commanding, Bashar and Air Officer Commanding, Zahurul Huq. He also served as Assistant Chief of Air Staff (Operations & Training) at air headquarters prior taking the appointment of  Chief of Air Staff.

Rahman was promoted from air commodore to air vice-marshal and appointed as the Chief of Air Staff on 8 April 2007, and promoted to Air Marshal on 24 May of the same year. As Chief of Staff he had  supported the introduction of new technology for the operation of aircraft, and a modernisation of the ageing Bangladesh air fleet. He had initiated a modern Personnel Evaluation System in BAF that resulted in revolutionary improvements in the Flying Output and Research and Development sectors. The modern objective methods of the Performance-based Evaluation and Tactical Evaluation systems are giving the BAF a new dimension of sustainable development.

The participation of BAF in United Nations peacekeeping missions had increased manifold during his tenure of office. BAF has reportedly received many accolades from world leaders and United Nations Headquarters for its professionalism, dedication and sincerity  in different UN missions. He retired on 12 June 2012 and Air Vice Marshal Enamul Bari was appointed as the new chief.

Personal life 
Zia is married and has one son and one daughter.

See also 
 Bangabandhu Aeronautical Centre

References 

1955 births
Bangladesh Air Force air marshals
Living people
Chiefs of Air Staff (Bangladesh)